Santa, officially the Municipality of Santa, is a 4th class municipality in the province of Ilocos Sur, Philippines. According to the 2020 census, it has a population of 14,992 people.

Due to Santa's natural setting (the ridge of Mount Tetas de Santa in the east; the winding Abra River and delta in the north and NW of Santa; and the South China Sea to the west), then Governor-General of the Philippines Theodore Roosevelt, Jr. on his visit in 1925 exclaimed: “The mountain in the east, the winding roping river in the north, and the immense sea in the west make Santa a poetic town.”

Etymology

These are the probable origins of the municipality's name.
 A popular lore tells us that when the scribe of the Spanish explorers was naming the places where they already established settlements, the scribe had a difficult time of thinking of a Catholic Saint's name of saints to name the place (Santa Catalina, Santa Lucia, and Santa Maria were already taken), so the town was simply named "Santa." (Some versions of the story say that the scribe fell asleep or was drunk when he was writing a name for the town and just wrote "Santa".)
 The municipality of Santa was formerly called Santa Catalina de Alexandria, Virgen y Mártir, after the town's patron saint Saint Catherine of Alexandria. According to folk stories, after the devastation of the town by the first flood in 1852 (Layos Bungsot), the name was shortened to Santa Catalina de Alexandria. The present name of Santa came to be, after the second flood of 1905 (Layos Nawnaw). It was believed that by changing the name after the disasters would save the town from further devastation.

History

Foundation of the pueblo
According to Augustinian maps of 1831 and 1834, Santa was founded in 1576. The Augustinian established missionary centers in the towns of Vigan in 1575 and Santa in 1576. On the founding of Bantay in 1591 as a pueblo, Santa was made its “visita” until 1713 when it became an independent vicariate. The prestige of the town was boosted in 1802 when the provisional diocese was established and was housed in the rectory of Santa until 1834.

Malong Revolt
The “Malong Revolt” disturbed the quiet life of the town in 1660-1661 when Andres Malong of Binalatongan (now San Carlos City in Pangasinan province) rose in arms to protest the abuses in the collection of tribute and in the conscription of men for “palo y servicios” (forced labor). Malong proclaimed himself “King of Pangasinan” and tried to extend his kingdom by sending his Count Pedro Gumapos to Ilocos.

Gumapos pursued the retreating Spaniards who sought refuge in Agoo in present-day La Union. The Spaniards and the loyalists made their last stand in Pideg, Santa. Pedro de la Peña, who was defending Pideg Pass, sheltered the great number of the rebels who camped in nearby Narvacan and offered them free passage across Pideg Pass.

Diego Silang revolt
On December 14, 1762, Diego Silang led the “caillianes” (common man or townsfolk) in the most obstinate insurrection against the Spaniards in the 18th century. He crystallized the discontent of the “caillianes” caused by the imposition of tribute and forced labor. He proclaimed a “Free Ilocos” and made Vigan its capital.

When the Spaniards failed to stop Diego Silang in combat, Miguel Vicos aided by Pedro Becbec who were both Silang's trusted friends, betrayed Diego Silang by shooting him in the back on May 26, 1763. Gabriela, the wife of Diego with the help of her uncle, Nicolas Cariño, continued her husband's fight and defeated the Spaniards and their soldiers in the battle of Banaoang, Santa on August 24, 1763.

Destructive floods
Fr. Pedro Torrices started the new church in 1849-1855 and Fr. Luis Lagar finished it in 1875.

In 1905, another destructive flood, “Layos Nawnaw” (literal: "Dissolving Flood") motivated the people to transfer the poblacion to Pasungol in the southern part of the town in 1907. Don Domingo Bueno y Ramirez, the presidente municipal (town mayor), transferred the government, and the new poblacion was laid out. Circumferential roads were laid out in the shape of a spider web with the town plaza in the middle. A hermita made of bamboo and cogon grass was put up, and a one-storey primary school building was constructed.

American colonial period
The guerrilla activities of Gen. Manuel Tinio dominated the Philippine–American War in Ilocos. The civil government of Ilocos Sur began to function in 1899 with Don Mena Crisologo, the former Ilocos Sur delegate to the Malolos Congress, as the first Civil Governor.

World War II and thereafter
On December 19, 1941, the Imperial Japanese Army landed in Santa. The people fled to the mountains where they suffered from privations, hunger and diseases. The Japanese soldiers held a garrison at the south of Quirino Bridge and massacred 70 civilians in Barrio Rizal on January 26, 1945.

In 1945, local Filipino forces under the Philippine Commonwealth Army 1st and 12th Infantry Division, Philippine Constabulary 1st Constabulary Regiment and the USAFIP-NL 121st Infantry Regiment liberated the town and defeated the Japanese Imperial forces at the end of World War II. On the resumption of the Commonwealth Government, Pres. Sergio Osmeña appointed Sixto Brillantes after being elected as assemblyman of the second district of Ilocos Sur.

Geography
The municipality of Santa is triangular shape. Some islands of the river delta are settled by the people of Santa. The largest island, Barangay Rancho, is connected by a bridge to the main town. Another island occupied by Brgys. Dammay and Oribi is only accessible by boat.

Politically, Santa is bordered by towns of Bantay and Caoayan of Ilocos Sur to the north; the town of San Quintin in Abra province to the east; and Narvacan, Ilocos Sur to the south.

It can be reached by bus, jeepney and other motorized means of transport by way of the National Highway.

The topography of the municipality is undulating to rolling with slope ranging from 0-30%.

Soil and vegetation
There are three types of soil in Santa, namely: clay loam which is used for crop production, clay on the eastern part of the town and sandy loam on the western part. Although Santa has fair type of soil, vegetative cover is good for rice, corn, vegetables and fruit-bearing trees.

Mineral resources
Major mineral resources of the municipality are salt from the coast, and gravel and sand washed down the river banks of Abra River. Gravel and sand are gathered along the river bank and sold for construction. Salt-making is found along the coastal barangays of Santa with some of the residents engaged in the industry as their means of livelihood.

Natural and man-made risk areas
Because of its location, Santa has been plagued by disasters and calamities since the Spanish Colonial Period (See Destructive flooding below). During heavy rains, large amount of water coming down from the Central Cordillera Mountains flows down to the sea through the Abra River, the sixth largest river system in the Philippines, devastating Santa which traverses the western part of the municipality. Flood prone areas in the western part of the town include Barangays Pasungol, Tabucolan, Calungboyan, Casiber, Rancho, Oribi and Dammay. Even places located at the foot of the mountain are also prone to flash floods because of the denuded mountain east of the town. During the typhoon of June 5, 1999, the storm surge devastated Santa destroying residences along the coastal barangays.

Climate

The type of climate in Santa is generally the same as the climate of all coastal towns of Ilocos Sur. There are two seasons in the region, wet and dry season. The dry season commences in the month of February and ends in the month of June while the wet season is during the rest of the year.

During the rainy season, Santa experience more or less 20 typhoons a year. Rainfall record of Santa is the same as the records of other municipalities of Ilocos Sur.

Barangays
Santa is politically subdivided into 26 barangays. These barangays are headed by elected officials: Barangay Captain, Barangay Council, whose members are called Barangay Councilors. All are elected every three years.

Demographics

In the 2020 census, Santa had a population of 14,992.

Economy

Government
Santa, belonging to the second congressional district of the province of Ilocos Sur, is governed by a mayor designated as its local chief executive and by a municipal council as its legislative body in accordance with the Local Government Code. The mayor, vice mayor, and the councilors are elected directly by the people through an election which is being held every three years.

Elected officials

Tourism

Banaoang Gap
It separates Santa and Bantay towns and stretches to San Quintin, Abra. The gap is spanned by the old and new Quirino Bridges connecting the two towns. A viewing deck is located in Barangay Banaoang in Santa offering dramatic view of the bridge and the broad Abra River backdropped by Mount Tetas de Santa, Mount Binitalo and the other mountains in the Ilocos Range.

Northern Luzon Heroes Hill National Park

Located southeast of Santa and partly in Narvacan, Ilocos Sur, the Northern Heroes Hill National Park was established on July 9, 1963, by Proclamation No. 132 encompassing  of beautiful mountain scenery.

Gabriela Silang Memorial Park
Located west of the national park along the National Highway is the Old Pideg Pass, the historic gateway to Santa, renamed Diego-Gabriela Silang Pass in 1976. The Gabriela Silang Memorial Park was erected here dedicated to Gabriela who was born in the old barrio of Caniogan in Santa on March 19, 1731, and is regarded as the first heroine of Ilocos.

References

External links

Municipality of Santa, Ilocos Sur
Pasyalang Ilocos Sur
Philippine Census Information
Local Governance Performance Management System

Municipalities of Ilocos Sur
Populated places on the Abra River